The Science and Rationalists' Association of India is a rationalist group based in Kolkata, India.

History
The first Indian Rationalist Association was started in 1949 by M.S. Ramanathan along with M.N. Roy and C.N. Annadorai in Chennai.Later Bengali rationalists established an organisation called 'Bharater Yuktibadi Samity' on March 1, 1985, the international rationalists' day. Two years later, in 1987, it was renamed as 'Bharatiya Bigyan O Yuktibadi Samiti'. Prabir Ghosh, the author of the Aloukik Noy Loukik book, series is the founder secretary and Dr. Dhirendranath Gangopadhyay was the first president of this organisation. Eminent science communicators Amit Chakraborty, Aparajito Basu, Jugalkanti Ray, Shankar Chakraborty and others were also associated during its formation. In 1986, Ghosh published the first book of the Aloukik Noy Loukik series, debunking various superstitious beliefs. It received wide circulation among Bengali readers of both West Bengal and Bangladesh, and the Rationalists' Association gained popularity.

Activities
The main goal of the organisation is to advocate against pseudoscience, astrology and mysticism.

References

External links
 Indian 'miracle lake' becomes pilgrim destination by "The Independent" Saturday 29 May 2010 

Rationalist groups based in India
1985 establishments in West Bengal
Organizations established in 1985